Elections to North Tyneside Metropolitan Council took place on 10 June 2004; the same day as other local council elections in England, along with European elections and London mayoral and Assembly elections.

North Tyneside Council is elected "in thirds" which means one councillor from each three-member ward is elected each year for the first three years with a fourth year when the mayoral election takes place.

2004 was the first election after the wards in North Tyneside changed meaning that the whole council was up for election. Holystone, Monkseaton, North Shields and Seatonville were used for the last time in 2003, and replaced by 4 new wards; Killingworth, Monkseaton North, Monkseaton South and Preston.

Battle Hill

Benton

Camperdown

Chirton

Collingwood

Cullercoats

Howdon

Killingworth

Longbenton

Monkseaton North

Monkseaton South

Northumberland

Preston

A further by-election was held on 6 October 2005. Details of this can be found here.

Riverside

St Mary's

Tynemouth

Valley

Wallsend

Weetslade

A further by-election was held on 23 June 2005. Details of this can be found here.

Whitley Bay

References
2004 election result from BBC
2004 North Tyneside Council elections

2004 English local elections
2004
21st century in Tyne and Wear